Hore Abbey (also Hoare Abbey, sometimes known as St Mary's) is a ruined Cistercian monastery near the Rock of Cashel, County Tipperary, Republic of Ireland.

'Hore' is thought to derive from 'iubhair' – yew tree. The former Benedictine abbey at Hore was given to the Cistercians by Archbishop David Mac Cerbaill (in 1270), who later entered the monastery, and was buried there in 1289. He endowed the Abbey generously with land, mills and other benefices previously belonging to the town. A story that is much cited by tour guides is that he evicted the Benedictines after a dream that they were about to kill him. This is unlikely to be true and probably arises from the Archbishop's 'interference' with the commerce of the city of Cashel. His disfavour of the established orders in Cashel certainly caused local resentment. He was resented by some of the townspeople, being considered too much in favour of the Irish by the more Anglicised. This is evident in the objection by the thirty-eight local brewers to the levy of two flagons out of every brewing and in the murder of two monks who were visiting the town. He was by all accounts an exceptionally quarrelsome man, who in his long career clashed with the Dean of Cashel, his fellow bishops and the Dublin administration.

Chronology 
1269 Archbishop David Mac Cerbaill made profession of the Cistercian rule, though remaining as Archbishop of Cashel
1270 Founded from Mellifont" the last Cistercian foundation in Ireland before the dissolution of the monasteries 
1540 Dissolved and property transferred to James Butler, 9th Earl of Ormond. Monks continued to serve the local parish. Later occupied as private dwellings 
1561 Lands granted by Elizabeth I to Sir Henry Radcliffe

Architecture 
Hore Abbey is distinctive among Irish Cistercian monasteries in that the cloister lies to the north. The siting of the Abbey, with the Rock of Cashel close by to the north, may explain this departure from the usual arrangement.

See also
 List of abbeys and priories in Ireland (County Tipperary)

Sources
Breen, Aidan "Mac Cerbaill (MacCarwell), David" Cambridge Dictionary of Irish Biography
Otway-Ruthven, A. J. A History of Medieval Ireland Barnes and Noble reissue New York 1993

Benedictine monasteries in the Republic of Ireland
Cistercian monasteries in the Republic of Ireland
Religion in County Tipperary
National Monuments in County Tipperary
Ruins in the Republic of Ireland
Religious organizations established in the 1260s
Ruined abbeys and monasteries